Ulospora is a genus of fungi in the family Testudinaceae. This is a monotypic genus, containing the single species Ulospora bilgramii.

References

Pleosporales
Monotypic Dothideomycetes genera
Taxa named by David Leslie Hawksworth